San Bernardino is a large city in the Inland Empire Metropolitan Area of Southern California.

San Bernardino may also refer to:

Churches 
San Bernardino alle Ossa, a church in Milan, Italy
San Bernardino (Verona), a church in Verona, Italy
San Bernardino, Rimini, a church in Rimini, Italy
San Bernardino, Urbino, a church in Urbino, Italy
San Bernardino Realino, a church in Carpi, Italy
Basilica of San Bernardino, a church in L'Aquila, Italy
San Bernardino in Panisperna, a church in Rome, Italy
Oratory of San Bernardino, Siena
San Bernardino da Siena, Carpi
San Bernardino de Siena Church, Xochimilco, Mexico
San Bernardino, Asciano

Landforms
San Bernardino (torrent), a torrent that flows through the Italian province of Verbano-Cusio-Ossola
San Bernardino Pass, a high mountain pass in the Swiss Alps 
San Bernardino River, in Sonora, Mexico
San Bernardino Strait, a strait in the Philippines
San Bernardino Valley, California 
San Bernardino Valley (Arizona)
San Bernardino Mountains, California
Little San Bernardino Mountains, California
San Bernardino National Forest, California
San Gorgonio Pass, California, sometimes referenced as the San Bernardino Pass

People
Bernardino of Siena (1380–1444), Italian priest, Franciscan missionary, and Catholic saint

Places

Guatemala
San Bernardino, Suchitepéquez

Mexico
San Bernardino Contla, two nearby villages in Tlaxcala, Mexico
San Bernardino, Chihuahua
San Bernardino, Texcoco, State of Mexico
San Bernardino, Oaxaca
San Bernardino Lagunas, Puebla
San Bernardino, Sonora
San Bernardino, Yucatán

Paraguay
San Bernardino, Paraguay
San Bernardino District, Paraguay, a district of the Cordillera department

Peru
San Bernardino District, San Pablo

Switzerland
San Bernardino, Switzerland

United States
San Bernardino County, California

Venezuela
San Bernardino, Libertador, Caracas, a parish of Libertador

Transportation
San Bernardino (Amtrak station), a passenger rail station in San Bernardino, California
San Bernardino Transit Center, a passenger rail station and bus terminal in San Bernardino, California
San Bernardino Freeway, designation for Interstate 10 connecting San Bernardino with Los Angeles
San Bernardino International Airport, a public airport in San Bernardino, California
San Bernardino Tunnel, on the A13 motorway in Switzerland
San Bernardino and San Diego Railway, now part of the Pacific Surfliner route between San Diego and Los Angeles

Other uses
San Bernardino Valley College, a community college located in San Bernardino, California
California State University, San Bernardino
San Bernardino de Sena Estancia, a ranch outpost of Mission San Gabriel Arcángel in Redlands, California
San Bernardino Ranch, a historic ranch in the southern San Bernardino Valley
San Bernardino meridian, one of three Principal meridians in the state of California
, two warships of the United States Navy

See also

San Ber'dino (song), by Frank Zappa and the Mothers of Invention
San Bernadino (song), by band Christie
Saint Bernard (disambiguation)
San Bernardo (disambiguation)
Bernard (disambiguation)